Lichenopteryx scotina is a moth in the family Eupterotidae. It was described by Hering in 1932. It is found in the Democratic Republic of Congo (Katanga).

References

Moths described in 1932
Eupterotinae
Endemic fauna of the Democratic Republic of the Congo